is a Japanese voice actor who works for Aoni Production. In 2010 he won the "Best Personality" Seiyu Award.

Onosaka was born in Sumiyoshi-ku, Osaka. He is known for his Kansai accent in some of his roles. He also the known voicing actor as Zhao Yun and Zhuge Liang in Japanese version of Dynasty Warriors and Warriors Orochi series.

In November 2020, it was announced Onosaka had tested positive for COVID-19. He is currently asymptomatic.

Filmography

Anime television series
1986
Gegege no Kitarō (Kurage no Hinotama)

1990
Yawara! (Reporter)

1991
Kingyo Chūihō! (Asaba, *Episode 3*)

1992
Tsuyoshi Shikkari Shinasai (Tsuyoshi Ikawa)
Sailor Moon (Jadeite)

1993
Slam Dunk (Hikoichi Aida, Yasuharu Yasuda)

1994
Omakase Scrappers (Narimasu, Ten Q)
Captain Tsubasa J (Ryoma Hino, Announcer)
Sailor Moon S (Kameda)

1997
Pokémon (Masaki)
Detective Conan (Kobayashi)

1998
Trigun (Vash the Stampede)
Momoiro Sisters (Keisuke Uchikawa)
Yoshimoto Muchikko Monogatari (Sashigame Watanabe)

1999
Omishi Magical Theater Risky Safety (Moe's Father)
Cardcaptor Sakura (Kerberos)
Kamikaze Kaitou Jeanne (Kaisei)
Flint: The Time Detective (Kinokuniya Bunzaemon)
Chiisana Kyōjin Microman (Arden Flame)
Power Stone (Fokker)
Pet Shop of Horrors (Leon Orcot)
Magic User's Club (Takeo Takakura)

2000
Pipopapo Patrol-kun (Katsuta Hit)
One Piece (Chew, Nugire Yainu)

2001
Angelic Layer (Ichiro Mihara)
The SoulTaker (Shiro Mibu)
Shaman King (Ryou Sugimoto)
The Prince of Tennis (Inakichi Nitobe, Referee, Rick, Takeshi Momoshiro)
Hajime no Ippo (Takeshi Sendo)

2002
Ultimate Muscle (Kinniku Mantarou)
Spiral (Takashi Sonobe)
Tokyo Mew Mew (Asano-kun)
Daigunder (Dorimogu)
Rockman EXE (Torakichi Aragoma)

2003
Wolf's Rain (Ik)
Requiem from the Darkness (Fushimiya)
Digimon Frontier (Skullsatamon)
Planetes (Boss)
Bobobo-bo Bo-bobo (Don Patch)

2004
Galaxy Angel X (Shirō Kazami)
Kinnikuman Nisei - Ultimate Muscle (Kinniku Mantarou)
Burst Angel (Azuma Iriki)
Pokemon Advance (Gai)
Detective Conan (Masashi Horikoshi)

2005
Ichigo 100% (Senpai)
GUNxSWORD (Kaiji)
Aquarion (Pierre Vieira)
Beast Machines: Transformers (Obsidian)
Bleach (Hollow)
Beet the Vandel Buster Excellion (Nyanjama)
MÄR (Nanashi)
One Piece (Spandam)

2006
Ayakashi (Kikimaru)
Kanon (Evil Scientist in Movie)
Kinnikuman Nisei - Ultimate Muscle 2 (Kinniku Mantarou)
Hell Girl: Two Mirrors (Chikaraya Hashizume)
Demashitaa! Powerpuff Girls Z (Kabuki Monster)
Ghost Slayers Ayashi (Shinza)
Night Head Genesis (Yoshiki Futami)
NANA (Matsuda)
Black Jack (Toru Tachibana)
Black Jack 21 (Pilot)
Yomigaeru Sora - RESCUE WINGS (Daigo Nihonmatsu)
One Piece (Spandine)

2007
Kaiji (Ohta)
Gegege no Kitarō (Ameburi-Kozou, Hideri-Gami)
Koutetsu Sangokushi (Masunori Chouhi)
The Story of Saiunkoku Second Series (Shun)
Gurren Lagann (Leeron)
Baccano! (Isaac Dian)
Bleach (Shinji Hirako)
Moetan (Ahiru no Ah-kun)
Lovely Complex (Haruka Fukagawa)

2008
Gintama (Daisaku Amarao)
Golgo 13 (Mouse)
Neo Angelique Abyss (J. D.)
Neo Angelique Abyss -Second Age- (J. D.)
Yatterman (Professor Oooku)

2009
Sgt. Frog (Briefs)
Saki (Saki's Father)
Dragon Ball Kai (Butta)
Hajime no Ippo: New Challenger (Takeshi Sendo)
Hayate the Combat Butler!! (Gouji Ashibashi)
Eden of the East (Chief Honda)
Hetalia: Axis Powers (France)
2010
Princess Jellyfish (Chief Editor)
Durarara!! (Isaac Dian, Max Sandshelt)
Detective Conan (Jirou Imaoka)
Yu-Gi-Oh! 5D's (Harald)

2011
The Idolmaster (Oil Baron)
Twin Angel: Twinkle Paradise (Alexander)
Toriko (Teppei)
You're Being Summoned, Azazel (Azazel)

2012
Horizon in the Middle of Nowhere II (Ben Johnson)
The Prince of Tennis II (Takeshi Momoshiro)
Saint Seiya Omega (Hydra Ichi)

2013
Gintama' (Hajime Obi)
Hajime no Ippo Rising (Takeshi Sendo)
Hakkenden: Eight Dogs of the East (Kaede)
Yondemasu yo, Azazel-san. Z (Azazel)

2014
Kill la Kill (Kenta Sakuramiya)

2015
JoJo's Bizarre Adventure: Stardust Crusaders Egypt Arc (Alessi)
Durarara!!×2 Shō (Max Sandshelt)
Durarara!! ×2 The Second Arc (Max Sandshelt)
One-Punch Man (Pri-Pri-Prisoner)

2018
Cardcaptor Sakura: Clear Card (Kerberos)
Yo-kai Watch Shadowside (Micchy)

2019
One-Punch Man 2 (Pri-Pri-Prisoner)

2021
Hetalia: World Stars (France)

2022
The Prince of Tennis II: U-17 World Cup (Rocky Meredith)
Bleach: Thousand-Year Blood War (Shinji Hirako)

2023
Trigun Stampede (Radio DJ)

Original video animation (OVA)
Be-Bop High School(1990-1998)(Hiroshi Katō)
Agent Aika (1997) (Shuntarō Michikusa)

Unknown date
.hack//SIGN (Piroshi)
Gatchaman (G-1 (Ken the Eagle))
Magic User's Club (Takeo Takakura)
Mobile Suit Gundam Seed Astray (Lowe Guele)
Nineteen 19 (青涩岁月)
Nurse Witch Komugi (Shiro Mibu)
Saint Seiya: Hades (Hydra Ichi, Perseus Algol)
Tales of Symphonia: The Animation (Zelos Wilder)

Anime films
Trigun: Badlands Rumble (2010) (Vash the Stampede)
 Gantz: O (2016) (Susumu Kimura)

Unknown date
Cardcaptor Sakura: The Sealed Card (Cerberus (true form)
Kinnikuman Nisei (Kinniku Mantarou)
Millennium Actress (Kyoji Ida)
Saint Seiya Tenkai Hen: Overture Hydra Ichi
The Prince of Tennis: The Two Samurai (Takeshi Momoshiro)
Hetalia: Paint It, White! (France)
Persona 3 The Movie: No. 2, Midsummer Knight's Dream (Jin Shirato)

Video games
Mermaid Prism (2006)
Persona 3 (2006) (Jin Shirato)
Bungou to Alchemist (2016) (Oda Sakunosuke)

Unknown date
.hack (Piroshi)
AbalaBurn (Kleude)
Castlevania Judgement (Grant Danasty)
Dragon Ball series - Burter (2009–present)
Dragon Quest XI(Sylvando)
Dynasty Warriors series (Zhao Yun, Zhuge Liang)
Final Fantasy XIII-2 (Ultros)
Gungrave (Balladbird Lee)
Magna Carta (Chris)
Rogue Galaxy (Simon Wicard)
Super Robot Wars series (Pierre Vieira, Leeron, Chouhi Gundam)
Tales of Symphonia (Zelos Wilder)
Tales of Symphonia: Dawn of the New World (Zelos Wilder)
Valkyria Chronicles (Leon Schmidt)
Valkyrie Profile (Jun)
Valkyrie Profile: Lenneth (Jun)
Kinnikuman Generations (Kinniku Mantaro)

Tokusatsu
Madan Senki Ryukendo (????) (ZanRyuJin)
Ressha Sentai ToQger vs. Kyoryuger: The Movie (????) (Clock Shadow)

CD
D.N.Angel "trilogy" (????) (with Soichiro Hoshi and Tomokazu Seki)  - "Groovy Blue" (Dark Mousy)

CD drama

Abunai series 3: Abunai Bara to Yuri no Sono
Abunai series 4: Abunai Campus Love (Wachi Okikura)
Ace Attorney Investigations (Larry Butz)
Aka no Shinmon (Kazukiyo Okuda)
Boxer Wa Inu Ni Naru series 3: Raibaru mo Inu wo Daku (Coach Nishizaki)
D.N.Angel Wink series (Dark Mousy)
Eden wo Tooku ni Hanarete series 1: Kami yo, Izuko no Rakuen (Seiichitou Tsubakimoto)
Eden wo Tooku ni Hanarete series 2: Ryokuin no Rakuen (Seiichitou Tsubakimoto)
Eden wo Tooku ni Hanarete series 3: Setsunai Yoru no Rakuen (Seiichitou Tsubakimoto)
Hetalia - Axis Powers (France)
Sakurazawa vs Hakuhou series 1: Shokuinshitsu de Naisho no Romance (Kazuhiro Okamoto)
Tales of Symphonia Rodeo Ride Tour (Zelos Wilder)
Tales of Symphonia A Long Time Ago (Zelos Wilder)

CD singles
The Prince of Tennis The Best Of Seigaku Players series (IX) - "Jump" (Takeshi Momoshiro)
The Prince of Tennis On the Radio Theme series (September, 2004) - "SAYONARA" (Takeshi Momoshiro)
Hetalia - Axis Powers With Love From Iceland  - "With Love From Iceland" (Mr. Puffin)

Dubbing
Beast Machines: Transformers (Obsidian)
South Park: Bigger, Longer & Uncut (Jimbo Kearn)

References

External links

 Masaya Onosaka at GamePlaza-Haruka Voice Acting Database 
 Masaya Onosaka at Hitoshi Doi's Seiyuu Database 
 Masaya Onosaka at Aoni Production .

1964 births
Japanese male video game actors
Japanese male voice actors
Living people
Male voice actors from Osaka
20th-century Japanese male actors
21st-century Japanese male actors
Aoni Production voice actors